This is a list of lists of San Francisco Bay Area topics, lists related to the San Francisco Bay Area, California, and its various subregions, excluding lists specific to the city of San Francisco itself. For the San Francisco-related lists, see Lists of San Francisco topics.

Buildings
List of Berkeley Landmarks, Structures of Merit, and Historic Districts
List of tallest buildings in Oakland, California
List of tallest buildings in San Jose

Culture
List of bands from the San Francisco Bay Area
List of San Francisco Bay Area festivals and fairs
List of museums in the San Francisco Bay Area
List of attractions in Silicon Valley
List of San Francisco Bay Area writers

Economy
List of companies based in the San Francisco Bay Area
List of acquisitions by Juniper Networks
List of television stations in the San Francisco Bay Area

Education
List of Nobel laureates affiliated with the University of California, Berkeley
List of University of California, Berkeley alumni
List of University of California, Berkeley faculty
List of Berkeley High School (Berkeley, California) people
List of Mills College people
List of Oakland California elementary schools
List of Oakland, California high schools
List of public Oakland California middle schools
List of Pacific Union College alumni
List of San Jose State University people
Santa Rosa City Schools
List of school districts in Sonoma County, California
List of Stanford University residence halls

Environment
List of Sonoma County Regional Parks facilities
List of parks in Oakland, California
List of beaches in Sonoma County, California
List of lakes in the San Francisco Bay Area
List of summits of the San Francisco Bay Area
List of watercourses in the San Francisco Bay Area
List of San Francisco Bay Area wildflowers

Geography
List of cities and towns in the San Francisco Bay Area
List of Berkeley neighborhoods
List of neighborhoods in Oakland, California
List of streets in San Jose, California

Government
List of mayors of Cotati, California
List of mayors of Oakland, California
List of city managers of San Jose, California
List of mayors of San Jose, California

History
Timeline of the San Francisco Bay Area
List of inmates of Alcatraz
List of ships built in Alameda, California
List of people associated with the California Gold Rush
List of Ohlone villages

National Register of Historic Places
National Register of Historic Places listings in Alameda County, California
National Register of Historic Places listings in Contra Costa County, California
National Register of Historic Places listings in Marin County, California
National Register of Historic Places listings in Mendocino County, California
National Register of Historic Places listings in Napa County, California
National Register of Historic Places listings in San Mateo County, California
National Register of Historic Places listings in Santa Clara County, California
National Register of Historic Places listings in Solano County, California
National Register of Historic Places listings in Sonoma County, California

People (by region)
List of people from Hayward, California
List of people from Marin County, California
List of people from Oakland, California
List of people from San Jose, California

Sports
List of Oakland Athletics Opening Day starting pitchers
List of Oakland Athletics team records
List of milestone home runs by Barry Bonds
List of California Golden Seals head coaches
List of California Golden Seals players
List of Golden State Warriors head coaches
List of baseball parks in Oakland, California
List of Oakland Raiders head coaches
List of San Jose Sharks players

Transportation
List of airports in the San Francisco Bay Area
List of Bay Area Rapid Transit stations
List of Caltrain stations
List of Golden Gate Transit routes
List of Muni Metro stations
List of Santa Clara VTA Light Rail stations
List of San Francisco Bay Area trains
Transportation in the San Francisco Bay Area
List of Santa Clara VTA bus routes

See also

Lists of San Francisco topics
Outline of California